Nikolaos Bosmos (born 4 August 1988) is a Greece international rugby league footballer who plays for the Rhodes Knights.

Playing career
In 2022, Bosmos was named in the Greece squad for the 2021 Rugby League World Cup, the first ever Greek Rugby League squad to compete in a World Cup.

References

External links
Greece profile
Greek profile

1988 births
Living people
Rugby league five-eighths
Rugby league halfbacks
Greek rugby league players
Greece national rugby league team players